The Consensus 1981 NCAA Men's Basketball All-American team, as determined by aggregating the results of four major All-American teams.  To earn "consensus" status, a player must win honors from a majority of the following teams: the Associated Press, the USBWA, The United Press International and the National Association of Basketball Coaches.

1981 Consensus All-America team

Individual All-America teams

AP Honorable Mention:

John Bagley, Boston College
Gene Banks, Duke
Earl Belcher, St. Bonaventure
Curtis Berry, Missouri
Rolando Blackman, Kansas State
Ray Blume, Oregon State
Kevin Boyle, Iowa
Clyde Bradshaw, DePaul
Darrell Browder, TCU
David Burns, Saint Louis
Antoine Carr, Wichita State
Howard Carter, LSU
Tom Chambers, Utah
Jamie Ciampaglio, Wagner
Sam Clancy, Pittsburgh
Riley Clarida, Long Island
Matt Clark, Oklahoma
Darius Clemons, Loyola (IL)
Bob Convey, Saint Francis (PA)
Ron Cornelius, Pacific
Quintin Dailey, San Francisco
Ron Davis, Arizona
Mickey Dillard, Florida State
Ronnie Dixon, Duquesne
Mike Evelti, Vermont
Mike Ferrara, Colgate
Rod Foster, UCLA
Ricky Frazier, Missouri
Zam Fredrick, South Carolina
Bob Fronk, Washington
Ken Green, Texas–Pan American
Andra Griffin, Washington
Pete Harris, Northeastern
Scott Hastings, Arkansas
Len Hatzenbeller, Drexel
Rod Higgins, Fresno State
Angelo Hill, Washington State
Jo Jo Hunter, Colorado
Eddie Johnson, Illinois
Frank Johnson, Wake Forest
Harry Kelly, Texas Southern
Albert King, Maryland
Larry Lawrence, Dartmouth
Cliff Levingston, Wichita State
Alton Lister, Arizona State
Durand Macklin, LSU
Jeff Malone, Mississippi State
Greg Manning, Maryland
Ethan Martin, LSU
David Maxwell, Fordham
Ronnie McAdoo, Old Dominion
Jim McCloskey, Loyola Marymount
Mike McGee, Michigan
Mark McNamara, California
Larry Nance, Clemson
Mike Olliver, Lamar
Michael Perry, Richmond
Eddie Phillips, Alabama
Ricky Pierce, Rice
John Pinone, Villanova
Mark Radford, Oregon State
David Russell, St. John's
Mike Sanders, UCLA
Danny Schayes, Syracuse
Byron Scott, Arizona State
Tom Seaman, Holy Cross
Jose Slaughter, Portland
Andre Smth, Nebraska
Derek Smith, Louisville
Dale Solomon, Virginia Tech
Gary Springer, Iona
Mike Strayhorn, William & Mary
Terry Teagle, Baylor
Linton Townes, James Madison
Corny Thompson, Connecticut
LaSalle Thompson, Texas
Kelly Tripucka, Notre Dame
Kelvin Troy, Rutgers
Elston Turner, Ole Miss
David Vann, Saint Mary's
Ken Webb, Fairleigh Dickinson
Buck Williams, Maryland
Sam Williams, Arizona State
Sid Williams, San Jose State
Dominique Wilkins, Georgia
Jim Wright, Rhode Island

References

NCAA Men's Basketball All-Americans
All-Americans